Guizhou Subdistrict is a subdistrict in Gaizhou, Liaoning, China. , it has 12 villages under its administration:
Guizhou Village
Huaishufang Village
Baishawan Village
Yangshan Village
Tuanpu Village
Donggou Village
Santaizi Village
Longbozi Village
Xi'ertaizi Village
Fangshen Village
Pozi Village
Xianglanqi Village

See also 
 List of township-level divisions of Liaoning

References 

Township-level divisions of Liaoning
Gaizhou